Carlos Dews is an American writer and university professor. He is the chair of the Department of English Language and Literature at John Cabot University in Rome, Italy. He co-writes a paranormal thriller series with S. J. Rozan under the pseudonym Sam Cabot.

Life and career 

Carlos Lee Barney Dews was born September 26, 1963 in Nacogdoches, Texas, the son of Carl and Lois Dews. He grew up there on a farm where his father bred and sold fighting cocks throughout east Texas and western Louisiana. He graduated from the University of Texas at Austin with a B.A. (with honors) in Humanities, and was conferred M.A. and Ph.D. degrees in American Literature by the University of Minnesota. He was tenured and promoted to associate professor at the University of West Florida in 1999. A Carson McCullers scholar, Dews served from 2001 to 2003 as the founding director of the Carson McCullers Center for Writers and Musicians at Columbus State University in McCullers’s hometown of Columbus, Georgia.

After ten years of university teaching, in 2006 Dews returned to graduate school at the New School University in New York. Following completion of an M.F.A. in Fiction Writing in 2008, he relocated to Rome, Italy, where he is an associate professor and chair of the Department of English Language and Literature at John Cabot University, director of the Institute for Creative Writing and Literary Translation, and director of Italy Reads in Rome. He was promoted to full professor at John Cabot University in 2014.

When a friend introduced him to the work of Carson McCullers, Dews discovered an affinity for her writing. This led to his doctoral dissertation on her unfinished autobiography. Five years later, after working for ten years to get permission to publish the work, he edited Illumination and Night Glare, the book based on her dictated notes for that autobiography. He added a detailed introduction and chronology, letters from World War II between McCullers and her husband to supplement the text's disjointed account, and included her outline from The Heart is a Lonely Hunter—initially called "The Mute". About Illumination, a review said, "Thanks to the diligent work of Carlos Dews...we are given another opportunity to look at the exceptional fiction writer (McCullers)...Dews bestows a great gift by including The Mute in his edition..."

He was interviewed for The Oprah Winfrey Show in April 2004, discussing Carson McCullers's book The Heart Is a Lonely Hunter, for which Oprah's Book Club lists Dews as an expert. His co-writing thrillers with S. J. Rozan started by telling friends he had an idea for a novel and asking if they knew someone who might be able to collaborate with him. Dews is on the faculty of Art Workshop International in Assisi, Italy, where he teaches creative writing. He is a member of the Authors Guild, International Thriller Writers, American Literature Association, and the Carson McCullers Society (past president).

Bibliography 

Carlos Dews's published work includes:

Fiction

Books (as Sam Cabot) 

Blood of the Lamb: A Novel of Secrets, Penguin/Blue Rider, 2013. 
Skin of the Wolf: A Novel, Penguin/Blue Rider, 2014. 
Sam Cabot books are co-written with S. J. Rozan

Short stories 

"Pueraria lobata", Rebel Yell 2, ed. Jay Quinn, Harrington Park Press, 2002, pp. 237–250. 
"Recoleta" Scrivener Creative Review No. 32, Spring 2007, pp. 21–29.
"The Other Borges: A Fiction", Conjunctions, April 4, 2007.

Non-fiction

Books 
This Fine Place So Far from Home: Voices of Academics from the Working Class, eds. Dews & Carolyn Leste Law, Temple University Press, 1995. 
Illumination and Night Glare: The Unfinished Autobiography of Carson McCullers, ed. Dews, University of Wisconsin Press, 1999.     · Iluminación y fulgor nocturno : autobiografia inacabada, trans. Ana María Moix & Ana Becciú, Seix Barral, 2001.     · Illuminations et nuits blanches : autobiographie inachevée, trans. Jacques Tournier, 10/18, 2001.     · Die Autobiographie. Illumination and night glare (von Carson McCullers), trans. Brigitte Walitzek, Schöffling, 2002.     · Ozareniye i nochnaya likhoradka : neokonchennaya avtobiografiya Karson Makkallers, trans. Mayya Tugusheva, KRUK-Prestizh, 2005. 
The Complete Novels of Carson McCullers, ed. Dews, Library of America, 2001.

Chapters 

 "Carson McCullers" American National Biography, eds. John A. Garraty & Mark C. Carnes, Oxford University Press, 1999, v. 14, pp. 944–946.  / 24 v. set 
 "McCullers, Carson" Reader's Guide to Lesbian and Gay Studies, ed. Timothy F. Murphy, Fitzroy Dearborn, 2000, pp. 381–383. 
 "Carson McCullers" The New Georgia Encyclopedia Companion to Georgia Literature, eds. Hugh Ruppersburg & John C. Inscoe, University of Georgia Press, 2007, pp. 298–303. 
 "Carson McCullers (1917-1967): 'The Brutal Humiliation of Human Dignity' in the South" Georgia Women: Their Lives and Times–Volume 2, eds. Ann Short Chirhart & Kathleen Ann Clark, University of Georgia Press, 2014, pp. 281–298.

Article 

 "Illumination & Night Glare: Excerpts from an Unfinished Autobiography by Carson McCullers" (cover story) Oxford American, 1998, no. 20, pp. 32–45.
 "The Great Eaters of Georgia" (a previously unpublished essay) by Carson McCullers (eds. Dews & James Mayo) Oxford American, Spring 2005, no. 49, pp. 80–85.

Dissertation 

 Illumination and Night Glare: The Unfinished Autobiography of Carson McCullers, C. L. Barney Dews (Carlos Lee Barney), Ph.D., University of Minnesota, 1994, 2 v., 485 leaves.

References

External links 

 Official Carlos Dews website
 How I Got To Be (½ of) Sam Cabot, by S.J. Rozan (accessed May 8, 2014)
 Art Workshop International: Writing from Life: Fiction and Memoir (accessed May 8, 2014)
 Carson McCullers Center for Writers and Musicians (accessed May 8, 2014)
 Carson McCullers Society (accessed May 8, 2014)
 Columbus State University: The Carlos L. Dews (Carson McCullers reference) Collection (accessed May 8, 2014)
 Conjunctions: The Other Borges: A Fiction (accessed June 2, 2014)
 John Cabot University (accessed May 8, 2014):Department of English Language & Literature;Institute for Creative Writing and Literary Translation;Italy Reads
 U of MN Library Catalog: Illumination and night glare : The unfinished autobiography of Carson McCullers (link to dissertation, accessed May 8, 2014)

1963 births
Living people
21st-century American novelists
American academics of English literature
American expatriate academics
American thriller writers
People from Nacogdoches, Texas
The New School alumni
University of Minnesota College of Liberal Arts alumni
University of Texas at Austin College of Liberal Arts alumni
American male novelists
Journalists from Texas
21st-century American male writers
Novelists from New York (state)
Novelists from Texas
21st-century American non-fiction writers
American male non-fiction writers